Dichomeris tepens is a moth in the family Gelechiidae. It was described by Edward Meyrick in 1923. It is found on Madagascar.

The forewings are ferruginous ochreous with a cloudy ferruginous-fuscous dot in the disc at one-fourth. The stigmata is moderate, cloudy, ferruginous fuscous, the plical somewhat before the first discal, the second discal transverse. The hindwings are light grey.

References

Moths described in 1923
tepens